Uno or UNO may refer to:

Arts, entertainment, and media

Film and television
"Uno" (Better Call Saul), premiere episode of the American TV series Better Call Saul
Uno (2004 film), a Norwegian drama film
Uno (2005 film), a Filipino action thriller film
Rai Uno, an Italian TV channel
Telegiornale Uno, a news program broadcast on Rai Uno
Sky Uno, a channel in the Sky family of networks in Italy
Azteca Uno, a Mexican television channel

Games
Uno (card game), a brand of card game by Mattel
Uno (handheld game), for the Game Boy Color
Uno (video game), the video game version of Uno

Music

Albums
Uno (La Ley album)
Uno (Malpaís album)
Uno (Uno Svenningsson album)
Uno (ThisGirl album)
Uno (Uno Svenningsson album)
¡Uno!, an album by Green Day

Songs
"Uno" (Heung me song), 2019 song by rapper Ambjaay
"Uno" (Little Big song), 2020 song that was to represent Russia in the Eurovision Song Contest 2020
"Uno" (Muse song), 1999 song by Muse
"Uno" (Enrique Santos Discépolo and Mariano Mores song), 1943 tango, popularized by Carlos Gardel
"Uno Song", by Self from the album Breakfast with Girls

Organizations

Political organizations
 United Nations Organization, a regional misnomer for the United Nations
A New Option or Una Nueva Opción (UNO), non-profit organization in Ecuador
United Nations-Oceans, mechanism of the United Nations system
United Nicaraguan Opposition, Nicaraguan political organization 1985–2000
United Opposition (Philippines) (UNO) now Genuine Opposition, Philippine umbrella political coalition

Academic organizations
National University of the West (Universidad Nacional del Oeste), Argentine national university
University of Nebraska Omaha, Omaha, Nebraska, United States
Omaha Mavericks, also called UNO Mavericks, the athletic program of the above school
University of Negros Occidental - Recoletos (UNO-Recoletos or UNO-R), Bacolod City, Negros Occidental, Philippines
University of New Orleans, New Orleans, Louisiana, United States
New Orleans Privateers, also called UNO Privateers, the athletic program of the above school
UNO Charter Schools, a branch of United Neighborhood Organization

Brands and enterprises
Uno (bus company), bus service operated by the University of Hertfordshire, England, United Kingdom
Uno Pizzeria & Grill, a restaurant franchise, also known as Pizzeria Uno or Uno's
Gasolineras Uno, a multinational gas stations company based in Honduras

People
Uno (given name)
Uno (surname)

Places

United States
Uno, Arkansas, an unincorporated community
Uno, Kentucky, a small town
Uno, Ohio, an unincorporated community
Uno, Virginia, an unincorporated community
Uno, West Virginia, an unincorporated community

Elsewhere
Uno (Guinea-Bissau), an island in the Bissagos Islands of Guinea-Bissau
Uno Station, a train station in Tamano, Okayama Prefecture, Japan

Science and technology
Uno (software), an open source cross-platform graphical user interface
Uno (unit) (symbol: U), an IUPAP unit proposal for dimensionless numbers and parts-per notation
Universal Network Objects, or UNO, a component model used in OpenOffice.org and derivatives
Unniloctium (chemical symbol: Uno), former temporary name of the chemical element Hassium
Arduino Uno, open-source microcontroller board

Vehicles
Uno (dicycle), an electric vehicle sometimes described as a motorcycle
Fiat Uno, a car
UNO 001, a Swedish sports car

Other uses
Uno (dog) or K-Run's Park Me In First, a beagle, 2008 "Best in Show" winner of the Westminster Kennel Club Dog Show
Uno, a type of single point score in indoor American football
Upazila Nirbahi Officer, or UNO, an officer who administers an Upazila in Bangladesh

See also
1 (disambiguation)
One (disambiguation)